Nogometni klub Tolmin, commonly referred to as NK Tolmin or simply Tolmin, is a Slovenian football club which plays in the town of Tolmin. The club was established in 1921 and competes in the Slovenian Third League. They play their home games at the Brajda Sports Park with a seating capacity for 250 spectators.

Honours

Slovenian Third League
 Winners: 2013–14

Littoral League (fourth tier)
 Winners: 2001–02, 2006–07

MNZ Nova Gorica Cup
 Winners: 2003–04, 2004–05, 2008–09

References

External links
Official website 

Association football clubs established in 1921
Football clubs in Slovenia
1921 establishments in Slovenia